Boys' Lockdown is a 2020 Philippine Boy's Love web series produced by Atty. Darwin Mariano of Bit by Bit Development Company (Ticket2Me). Originally written by Danice Mae P. Sison as an eight-episode series, it was reduced to six due to limited production resources during the COVID-19 pandemic.

The official trailer was released on October 1, 2020, while the first episode premiered on the Ticket2Me video platform exactly two weeks later at 8:00PM Philippine Standard Time and on Ticket2Me YouTube channel the following Sunday night. The series also premiered on Heart of Asia on April 11, 2021, 11:00PM Philippine Standard Time.

Plot
Love in the time of a pandemic. While it’s certainly not the best time to go out, meet someone and fall in love, Key and Chen find each other in the middle of the enhanced community quarantine and connect in ways that surprise them both. As they get to know each other despite the restrictions, challenges and even dangers stemming from the pandemic, something very special starts to blossom between them. In a time when we’re forced to keep apart from each other, does love have the power to connect us?

Cast and characters

Main
 Ali King (Alonzo Raphael Elequin) as Key Kalunsod, an introvert college student stuck in Metro Manila while his parents reside in their hometown of Baguio.
 Alec Kevin (Alec Kevin Rigonan) as Chen "Chennie" Chavez, popularly known online as "CCStrng"

Supporting
 Teetin Villanueva as Olive "Libby" Chavez, Chen's older sister (Ate, Ats)
 Kaloy Tingcungco as Martin "Marts" Ilagan, Key's friend
 Crystal Paras as Devorha "Dev" Mapile, Key's ex-girlfriend
 Ivoy Colo as Whilce, Security Officer at Key's dorm
 Luis Padilla as Dicky, Community Volunteer at Chen and Olive's subdivision 
 Laksa, Chavez's family dog

Guest role 
 Macoy Dubs as Auntie Julie (Ep. 1)
 Meann Espinosa as Drugstore Cashier (Ep. 1)
 Jhon Leo Hilario as Mineral Water Seller (Ep. 2)

Episodes

Specials
On December 1, Ticket2Me YouTube channel released a trailer entitled "The Making of #BoysLockdown Coming Soon!"

Production

Development
Boys Lockdown is the brainchild of Bit By Bit Development Company (Ticket2Me) Founder and Executive Producer Darwin Mariano who was inspired to create his own BL series after the success of 2gether: The Series. He assembled a creative team in April 2020 to persuade Director Jade Castro to onboard and six months later, the first episode premiered.

He also shared that the Boy's Love genre helped him find happiness during what was a terrible time for his family and the rest of the world.

On November 12 due to Typhoon Ulysses that hit Metro Manila and many parts of Luzon, many in the post production team have been without power/internet the night before. Boys' Lockdown Executive Producer and Ticket2Me Founder-CEO Atty. Darwin Mariano decided to move Episode 5 release to November 19 to ensure his team can attend to their loved ones and stay safe as they complete their work for the episode. On the same day, Mariano organized a live YouTube broadcast for Bangon Luzon (Typhoon Relief) to call for donations to help those affected by the typhoons.

Casting
Olive and Libby were originally drafted as two separate roles (Mom and younger sister of Chen respectively), but were later combined as just an older sister due to quarantine restrictions to cast for a teenager role.

Release

Reception 

YouTube views as of December 7, 2020:

Music

Future
The statement "Key and Chen will return." was shown at the end of Episode 6 (Finale)'s second part video, formally signaling a second season.

A teaser video for season two, called "Love Team: Beyond Boys' Lockdown" premiered on the Ticket2Me youtube channel on November 28th, 2021, with a full cast published on May 28, 2022.

See also
 Gameboys
 Hello Stranger
 Gaya Sa Pelikula
 Ben X Jim
 Oh, Mando!

External links

References

2020 web series debuts
2020 web series endings
Philippine LGBT-related web series